Elaine Lee is American actor and playwright.

Elaine Lee may also refer to:

Elaine Lee (actress) (1939–2014), South African-born, Australian-based actor
Elaine Lee (footballer), New Zealand international football (soccer) player